Viana is a genus of land snails with an operculum, terrestrial gastropod mollusks in the family Helicinidae. 

Viana is the type genus of the subfamily Vianinae.

Species 
Species within the genus Viana include:
 Viana regina (Morelet, 1849)

References 

 Bank, R. A. (2017). Classification of the Recent terrestrial Gastropoda of the World. Last update: July 16th, 2017

External links
 Adams H. & Adams A. (1853-1858). The genera of Recent Mollusca; arranged according to their organization. London, van Voorst. Vol. 1: xl + 484 pp.; vol. 2: 661 pp.; vol. 3: 138 pls. [Published in parts: Vol. 1: i-xl (1858), 1-256 (1853), 257-484 (1854). Vol. 2: 1-92 (1854), 93-284 (1855), 285-412 (1856), 413-540 (1857), 541-661 (1858). Vol. 3: pl. 1-32 (1853), 33-96 (1855), 97-112 (1856), 113-128 (1857), 129-138 (1858) 
 Gray J.E. (1856). Notice of a new subgenus of Helicinidae. The Annals and Magazine of Natural History. ser. 2, 18: 414

Helicinidae